The lyre-patterned slider  (Lerista chordae)  is a species of skink found in Queensland in Australia.

References

Lerista
Reptiles described in 2005
Taxa named by Andrew P. Amey
Taxa named by Alex S. Kutt
Taxa named by Mark Norman Hutchinson